Locarno FART railway station is a railway station that serves the city of Locarno, in the Swiss canton of Ticino. It is the Swiss terminus of the cross-border metre gauge railway line from Domodossola in Italy, which opened in 1923. Until 1990 these trains terminated in the forecourt of the mainline station, after passing through the streets of Locarno. This was replaced by a new underground station and section of line.

Since 1990, the station has been located underneath and physically connected to  station, the city's primary railway station, although they do not share any tracks. The station is the eastern terminus of the  Domodossola–Locarno line of the Regional Bus and Rail Company of Ticino (FART).

Services 
 the following services stop at Locarno FART:

References

External links 
 
 

Railway stations in Ticino
Regional Bus and Rail Company of Ticino stations
Railway stations in Switzerland opened in 1990